Jeffrey Carlson (born June 23, 1975) is an American, Broadway, film, television actor and singer, known for his role as the transgender character, Zoe on the long-running daytime soap opera All My Children.

Education
Carlson was born in Long Beach, California. His mother named him Jeffrey because she was a fan of All My Children and of the character Jeff Martin on the show. He studied acting at the University of California Davis, where he graduated in 1997 with a B.A. in dramatic art. Carlson then trained at New York City's Juilliard School as a member of the Drama Division's Group 30 (1997–2001).

Career
Carlson debuted on Broadway in Edward Albee's The Goat or Who is Sylvia? in 2002 and also appeared in the Broadway revival of Tartuffe in 2003. He later appeared in the short-lived Boy George Broadway musical Taboo in 2003 and 2004. He was nominated for the 2004 Drama Desk Award for Outstanding Featured Actor in a Musical for the role of Marilyn in Taboo. In 2005, he had a small role as Egon in the Will Smith romantic comedy Hitch. In August 2006, he appeared in a daytime role on All My Children, as a British rock star named Zarf. In late November 2006, he returned to the role. In the course of the storyline, Zarf was revealed to be a transgender woman named Zoe, who also happened to be a lesbian.  All My Children won a GLAAD Media Award for Outstanding Daily Drama in 2007 for this storyline. He appeared in the title role of Lorenzaccio at the Shakespeare Theatre Company in Washington, D.C. and returned in June 2008 to play Hamlet.

References

External links
 
 
 Photo Gallery, Shakespeare Theatre Company, Hamlet
 "Shakespeare Theatre Company's 2006-2007 Season Ends With Hamlet". Shakespeare Theatre Company. Press Release. April 30, 2007.
 "Carlson, Cuccioli, Pascal, Zarish, et al. Set for D.C. Hamlet". Theatermania. Brian Scott Lipton, May 1, 2007.
 "Jeffrey Carlson Meets a Ghost in DC Hamlet, Materializing June 5". Playbill. Kenneth Jones. June 5, 2007.
 "'Cell Phone': Sarah Ruhl's Latest Calling". The Washington Post. Jane Horwitz. June 6, 2007.
 "Carlson Is Hamlet, Opening June 11 at DC's Shakespeare Theatre". Playbill. Kenneth Jones. June 11, 2007.
 "ASK PLAYBILL.COM: The Demands of Hamlet". Playbill. Zachary Pincus-Roth. June 14, 2007.
 "An American 'Hamlet' for the Ages". The Tentacle. Roy Meachum. June 22, 2007.
 "A Nuanced 'Hamlet'". Washington Post. Joe O'Neill. July 7, 2007.
 "Shakespeare Favorite Undergoes Another Adaptation". NPR Weekend Edition. Liane Hansen. July 22, 2007.
 "Taboo and 'All My Children' Star to Head Cast of Yale Rep Richard II", Playbill. Ernio Hernandez. August 16, 2007. 
 "Full Cast, Creative Team Set for Yale Rep's Richard II", theatermania.com. Dan Bacalzo. August 28, 2007.

American male soap opera actors
American male stage actors
Juilliard School alumni
University of California, Davis alumni
Male actors from Long Beach, California
1975 births
Living people